Farid Ismagilovich Zhangirov (born 15 May 1966) is a Russian football coach and a former player.

External links
 

1966 births
Sportspeople from Tolyatti
Living people
Soviet footballers
FC Lada-Tolyatti players
FC Dynamo Kirov players
FC Zenit Saint Petersburg players
FC Ural Yekaterinburg players
Russian footballers
Russian Premier League players
Russian football managers
Russian expatriate football managers
Expatriate football managers in Kazakhstan
Association football midfielders
Association football forwards